Disraeli Glacier is a glacier on northern Ellesmere Island, Nunavut, Canada. It lies in Quttinirpaaq National Park, South-West of the Disraeli Fiord. It is believed to have been named after Benjamin Disraeli, a British politician in the mid 1800s.

See also
List of glaciers

References

Glaciers of Qikiqtaaluk Region
Ellesmere Island
Arctic Cordillera